Sainagar Shirdi railway station (station code: SNSI) is a railway station in the city of Shirdi, Maharashtra state, India. Sainagar Shirdi is a railway terminus and belongs to Central Railways of Indian Railways. It is located at about 3 km from the Holy Temple of Shri Sai Baba Samadhi. Temple authority Shri Sai Baba Sansthan Trust runs free buses from the station to the Temple.

History
The -long Puntamba–Shirdi link, connecting the holy city of Shirdi to the Manmad–Daund branch line was completed in 2009. Work began in 2003. The new railway station, Sainagar Shirdi is well connected with many direct trains to different places. The Manmad–Puntamba-Sainagar Shirdi is a broad-gauge line which was electrified in 2011–12. Before this rail link pilgrims reached the town by road after alighting at Kopargaon, Nagarsol, Manmad and Nashik Road railway stations.

Passenger Facilities 

The station has two waiting halls one for Upper Class and one for General Class ticket holders. The waiting halls are very small and difficult to handle large number of passengers. Indian Railways have given a complete makeover with massive transformation to station under Railway's beautification and redevelopment initiative. The station, which falls under Solapur Division of Central Railway zone, has been beautified with paintings to walls and upgraded with various ultra modern facilities. Some of the newly introduced facilities and amenities include new Foot over Bridge (FOB), a new food plaza, lifts, new toilet, CCTV cameras, Wi-Fi Service, coach guidance system, train watering facility at second platform along with tree plantation.

The station doesn't have cloakrooms and any kind of book stalls. The railway track ends at Shirdi railway station and no train leaves further which makes difficult to catch other trains if one misses the train.

Food facilities 

An IRCTC food canteen is present in the first platform of the station. This provides both in house sitting and parcel services. Snacks are sold by other vendors.

Trains 

 22147 Dadar Central–Sainagar Shirdi Weekly Superfast Express 
 17207 Sainagar Shirdi–Vijayawada Express (Wednesday) via Secunderabad
 17001 Sainagar Shirdi–Secunderabad Express via Bidar (Monday and Saturday)
 17205 Sainagar Shirdi–Kakinada Port Express via Secunderabad (Sunday, Tuesday and Thursday) 
 51034 Mumbai CST–Sainagar Shirdi Fast Passenger via Daund
 22602 Sainagar Shirdi-Chennai Central SuperFast Express (Friday) via Yelahanka, Krishnarajapuram (Bangalore), Daund,
 22893 Sainagar Shirdi – Howrah SuperFast Express Via Nagpur (Saturday)
 18504 Sainagar Shirdi–Visakhapatnam Express via Kazipet(Friday)
 12131 Dadar Central–Sainagar Shirdi Superfast Express via Nasik (Sunday, Tuesday and Thursday)
 16218 Mysore–Sainagar Shirdi Express via Bangalore, Daund (Tuesday)
 22455 Sainagar Shirdi–Kalka Express via Bhopal –Agra–New Delhi (Tuesday & Saturday) 
 20857 Puri–Sainagar Shirdi Weekly Superfast Express via Manmad–Bhusawal–Nagpur–Raipur–Bhubaneswar (Sunday)
 17418 Tirupati–Sainagar Shirdi Express via Manmad Secunderbad
 11001 Sainagar Shirdi–Pandharpur Express
 77657 Jalna–Sainagar Shirdi DEMU

References

External links 
 Sainagar Shirdi Trains
 

Railway stations in Ahmednagar district
Transport in Shirdi
Railway stations opened in 2009
Solapur railway division